Sheubani is a settlement in the Java district of South Ossetia. 
It is located on the left bank of Jejora river ( a tributary of Rioni river) and borders Kvaisa on it east side.

See also
 Dzau district

References 

Populated places in Dzau District